Kalofer is a town in central Bulgaria, located on the banks of the Tundzha between the Balkan Mountains to the north and the Sredna Gora to the south. Kalofer is part of Plovdiv Province and the Karlovo municipality. It is best known as the birthplace of Bulgarian poet and revolutionary Hristo Botev.

The modern settlement of Kalofer emerged in the 16th century, managing to preserve its Bulgarian character in the Ottoman Empire and to develop as a centre of craftsmanship, primarily cord production. The Kalofer monastery has been in operation since 1640 and the convent since 1700. During the Bulgarian National Revival the town became a centre of revolutionary activity, being the birthplace of figures such as Hristo Botev, Exarch Joseph, Dimitar Panichkov, Nikola Ivanov.

Geography 

Kalofer is located in the southern outskirts of Stara Planina. It is only 17 kilometers away from Karlovo, еlevation 603 m (1,978 ft), 22 km away from Sopot, 56 km away from Plovdiv, 222 km away from Burgas, 300 km away from Varna and 164 km from the capital of Bulgaria Sofia.

History 

Kalofer was founded in the 16th century (1533). From the very beginning it enjoyed privileges as a city, which allowed it to preserve its typical Bulgarian character. In the time when traditional customs were booming about 1200 devices for producing traditional colored Bulgarian wollen threads (gaitan) were operating in the town. Traditional Bulgarian holidays have always been observed in Kalofer. The town has been burnt down at least three times. Due to forestation the marks from the damage has been covered, but they can still be found here and there. With the passage of time, residents of Kalofer have created their own methods of survival and have cultivated a strength of character, which has remained their typical personality trait until today. Each time when the town was burnt, the people of Kalofer built it all over again, carrying stones from their own farming land, working through the night. Usually reconstruction activities started with re-building the church or the monastery.

Religion 

Kalofer has a number of churches and monasteries, many with church bells. On a small street is a convent for girls, inheriting four metochions, in which Anastasia Dimitrova, the first Bulgarian female teacher, was educated. The monastery for men has been open since 1640, and the convent for nuns since 1700. Today, both of them, despite the numerous burnings, are open for visitors.

Economy 

In Kalofer typical Bulgarian customs and traditions have been well preserved over the centuries. A part of the attractions in the region is visiting ateliers producing the internationally famous Kalofer lace or the traditional rugs or woolen covers (kitenitsi). The making of souvenirs, works of copper, barrels for wine, incrustrated knives, as well as the typical Bulgarian dishes will always be remembered in this region.

Amenities 
There is no bank in Kalofer, but two bank branches are available. In the city center there are two automated teller machines.

The post office in Kalofer is open Monday to Friday, and there are shops and convenience stores in the area. Several shops are located in the center of the town, and there is a market on Thursdays.

Annual events

January 6: Birth of Hristo Botev and Epiphany (Yordanov Den).
June 2: Day of Botev.
August 15: Holiday of Kalofer Lace.

Honour
Kalofer Peak on Livingston Island in the South Shetland Islands, Antarctica is named after Kalofer.

Famous people

Revolutionaries 
 Vidul Stranski
 , Bulgarian revolutionary from VMORO, Chetnik of Ivan Naumov Alyabaka
 Galab Voivoda (ca. 1838 - 1921)
 Dimitar Pashov (1882 -?), Participant in the Ilinden-Preobrazhensko uprising in the Edirne region with the detachment of Krastyo Bulgaria
 Ivan Degov Karlovets (1876 -?), Participant in the Ilinden-Preobrazhensko uprising in the Edirne region with the detachment of Krastyo Bulgaria
 Panko St. Parvanov (1875 -?), Participant in the Ilinden-Preobrazhensko uprising in the Edirne region with the detachment of Krastyo Bulgaria
 Stoyan Buynov (around 1839 - 1908)
 Stefan Kostov, revolutionary from VMORO, Chetnik of Nikola Ivanov
 Hristo Botev, poet and revolutionary (1848 - 1876)
 Hristo Stefanov (1866 -?), Activist of the IMRO, participant in the Ilinden-Preobrazhensko uprising in 1903 with the detachment of Ivan Varnaliev

Personalities of education,culture and arts 
 
 Atanas Tinterov, professor of mathematics (1856 - 1927)
 Botyo Petkov from Karlovo, teacher (1815 - 1869)
 Dimitar Mutev, Odessa (1818 - 1864)
 Dimitar Panichkov, publisher and printer (c.1810 - 1909)
 Dimitar Fingov, teacher (1840 - 1912)
 Ivan Kozarev, teacher (1849 - 1933)
 Kostadin Bradinski, teacher (1847 -?)
 Nenko Koritarov, cultural figure, conductor, composer (ed. "The Blacksmith's Song"), member of the Union of Bulgarian Composers (UBC) (1925 - 2008)
 Nikola Kasapski, teacher, writer and translator (unknown - 1879)
 Nikola Batsarov, teacher (1881 - 1892)
 Nikola Nachov, writer and historian (1859 - 1940)
 Stefan Avramov, teacher (1862 - 1908)
 Stefan Kanchev, graphic artist (1915 - 2001)
 Stefan Botev, teacher (1854 - 1890)

External links
 The official forum of Kalofer
 Transportation, logistics and offroad services in Kalofer and nearby in Balkan mountain (at the moment Bulgarian version only)
 Website about Kalofer and the Central Balkan Mountains
 Kalofer at Journey.bg
 Nikola Gruev's photo gallery of Kalofer
 Website about Hristo Botev (in Bulgarian)

Towns in Bulgaria
Populated places in Plovdiv Province